Struer Municipality is a municipality (Danish, kommune) in Mid Jutland Region on the Jutland Peninsula in west Denmark. The municipality includes the island of Venø. January 2022). Its mayor is Niels Viggo Lynghøj, a member of the Social Democrats party.
The main town and the site of its municipal council is the city of Struer.

Denmark's smallest church, built ca. 1600, is located on the island of Venø.  The island has a population of approx. 160, of which most work on the mainland.  The island is 7.5 km long and 1.5 km at its widest point.

On January 1, 2007, Struer municipality was, as the result of Kommunalreformen ("The Municipal Reform" of 2007), merged with existing Thyholm municipality to form an enlarged Struer municipality.

The city of Struer

Politics

Municipal council
Struer's municipal council consists of 21 members, elected every four years.

Below are the municipal councils elected since the Municipal Reform of 2007.

Notable people 
 Kristian Ostergaard (1855 in Østergård - 1931) a Danish-American Lutheran pastor, educator and author, emigrated to the US in 1878.
 Jakob Lyng (1907 in Søndbjerg – 1995) a Danish fencer, competed at the 1948 and 1952 Summer Olympics
 Grethe Sønck (1929 in Hjerm – 2010) a Danish actress and singer

Sister cities

References

External links 

 
Struer tourist bureau
Struer Museum
Struer Statsgymnasium

 

 
Municipalities of the Central Denmark Region
Municipalities of Denmark
Populated places established in 2007